Misadventures of Doomscroller is the eighth studio album by Dawes, released on July 22, 2022 via Rounder Records.

Album Content
 On Misadventures of Doomscroller, the band diverts from their short, more lyrically focused songs of the past, to longer, more instrumental songs. Frontman Taylor Goldsmith mentions this while talking about 'Someone Else's Cafe / Doomscroller Tries To Relax' on the Dawes website: "Every time a take was completed felt like a major accomplishment. It being 10 minutes really raised the stakes. Didn’t wanna be the guy to mess up in minute 7 or 8 with everyone playing flawlessly up to that point. This whole album, and this song especially, felt a little beyond our comfort zone and I’m really proud of what that’s done to the music."

Critical Reception

Misadventures of Doomscroller was named one of the favorite rock albums of 2022 by AllMusic users.

Track listing
All songs were written by Taylor Goldsmith, except where noted.

References 

Dawes (band) albums
2022 albums